Tun Musa bin Hitam (Jawi: موسى بن هيتم; born 18 April 1934) is a Malaysian politician who was Deputy Prime Minister of Malaysia from 1981 to 1986, serving under Mahathir Mohamad. He was the chairman of Sime Darby Berhad.

Early life and education
Musa bin Hitam was born in Johor Bahru, British Malaya in 1934. Musa was born to a Malay father of Javanese descent and a mother of Chinese descent, who was adopted by and grew up in a Malay household at the age of five.

He continued his studies at the English College Johore Bahru. He also received his bachelor's degree from the University of Malaya and his master's degree from the University of Sussex. He has since been awarded with various honours, including an Honorary Doctorate from the University of Sussex and an Honorary Doctorate from Ohio University (in 1980). Musa has held various posts at the international level at various times. These included being Chairman of the Commonwealth Parliamentary Association, Member of the Board of UNESCO, Leader of the Commonwealth Observer Delegation to the Malawi general elections and Member of the Commonwealth Ministers Delegations to Nigeria, Pakistan, Fiji and Gambia.

Political career
In the 1960s, Musa was briefly Acting Secretary-General of UMNO. He was later expelled from the party in the wake of the 13 May racial rioting for insubordination to Prime Minister and UMNO President Tunku Abdul Rahman. During his political exile, he obtained his Master's from the University of Sussex.

In 1971, he was readmitted to UMNO under the Tunku's successor, Tun Abdul Razak. He rose quickly, becoming Deputy Whip of the Alliance coalition in Parliament, and was elected as a member of the UMNO Supreme Council. He was elected as a UMNO Vice-President in 1978.

When Mahathir bin Mohamad succeeded Hussein Onn as Prime Minister of Malaysia, he declared the election for the Deputy Presidency of UMNO open; and thus by extension the Deputy Prime Ministership — was open; he would not support any candidate. Musa Hitam faced Tengku Razaleigh Hamzah in 1981 the party election. Eventually, Musa won the election with 722 votes to Razaleigh's 517 votes, becoming the new Deputy President and Deputy Prime Minister. Razaleigh blamed himself for taking "a rather passive stance" and not having a campaign strategy.

Government positions
Before becoming Malaysia's fifth Deputy Prime Minister and Minister of Home Affairs in 1981–1986, Musa held a number of key government posts, including
 Chairman of the Federal Land Development Authority (FELDA)
 Deputy Minister of Trade & Industry (1970–1974)
 Minister of Primary Industries (1974–1978); and
 Minister of Education (1978–1981).
 Deputy Prime Minister (1981–1987)
Musa retired after the UMNO leadership crisis and was replaced by Ghafar Baba as Deputy Prime Minister in 1987.

Post-political career
In 1987, Tengku Razaleigh challenged Mahathir Mohamad for the presidency of UMNO. Musa Hitam, who was then having a growing rift with Mahathir, resigned as Deputy Prime Minister, citing irreconcilable differences with Mahathir. He then joined Razaleigh's Team B as UMNO deputy president candidate. In the election, Dr. Mahathir and his Team A managed to retain his position and power over the party. However, UMNO was split into two separate entities as Tengku Razaleigh was left unsatisfied with the result. The split forced the Malaysian court to declare UMNO as illegal. Shortly after the court ruling, Dr. Mahathir reestablished UMNO as UMNO Baru (New UMNO), though the new UMNO was badly weakened. Tengku Razaleigh at the same time went on his own path and found a new political party called Semangat 46 in 1989. The number 46 refers to the year UMNO was founded. Musa, however, decided to retire from politics and has not joined the fray since.

Between 1990 and 1991, he was Malaysia's Special Envoy to the United Nations, and since 1995 he has been the Prime Minister's Special Envoy to the Commonwealth Ministerial Action Group (CMAG). Tan Sri Musa also led the Malaysian delegation to the UN Commission on Human Rights from 1993 to 1998 and was elected Chairman of the 52nd Session of the Commission in 1995. As a member of UMNO, Musa has held various positions within the party up to Deputy President until 1987.

He also served as the Chairman of Suhakam, the Malaysian Human Rights Commission, from 1999 till 2002. In 2007, Musa became the chairman of Synergy Drive Berhad, the entity which arose out of the newly formed merger between Sime Darby, Guthrie, and Golden hope Plantations.  He also serves on the International Advisory Council of the Brookings Doha Center. Musa is currently the Chairman of the World Islamic Economic Foundation.

Personal life
Musa was married to Toh Puan Datin Ines Maria Reyna, a Peruvian of Spanish descent, whom he first met at Lima, Peru in 1959 as an international student. They had 3 children: Mariana, Carlos Abdul Rashid and Rosana. Carlos was killed together with his wife Rozita Datuk Abu Bakar during the Highland Towers collapse in December 1993.

Musa is now married to Toh Puan Zulaikha Sheardin. His daughter Mariana died on 5 November 2022.

Election results

Honours

Honours of Malaysia
  : 
  Commander of the Order of the Defender of the Realm (PMN) – Tan Sri (1994)
  Grand Commander of the Order of Loyalty to the Crown of Malaysia (SSM) – Tun (2006)
  :
  Knight Grand Commander of the Order of the Crown of Johor (SPMJ) – Dato' (1973)
  Knight Grand Companion of the Order of Loyalty of Sultan Ismail of Johor (SSIJ) – Dato' (1977)
 First Class of the Sultan Ibrahim Medal (PIS I) (1982)
  :
  Knight Grand Commander of the Order of the Crown of Selangor (SPMS) – Dato' Seri (1982)
  :
  Knight Grand Commander of the Premier and Exalted Order of Malacca (DUNM) – Datuk Seri Utama (1982)
  :
  Knight Grand Commander of the Order of Loyalty to Negeri Sembilan (SPNS) – Dato' Seri Utama (1982)
  :
  Grand Commander of the Order of Kinabalu (SPDK) – Datuk Seri Panglima (1984)

Foreign honour

  :
  Grand Cordon of the Order of the Rising Sun (2018)

Notes and references

External links
 FELDA Official site

1934 births
Alumni of the University of Sussex
Deputy Prime Ministers of Malaysia
Government ministers of Malaysia
Living people
People from Johor Bahru
Malaysian Muslims
Malaysian people of Malay descent
Malaysian politicians of Chinese descent
Malaysian people of Javanese descent
United Malays National Organisation politicians
Members of the Dewan Rakyat
Commanders of the Order of the Defender of the Realm
Grand Commanders of the Order of Loyalty to the Crown of Malaysia
Grand Cordons of the Order of the Rising Sun
Knights Grand Commander of the Order of the Crown of Johor
Education ministers of Malaysia
Home ministers of Malaysia
University of Malaya alumni
Knights Grand Commander of the Order of the Crown of Selangor
Grand Commanders of the Order of Kinabalu